George Friedman (born February 1, 1949) is a Hungarian-born U.S. geopolitical forecaster, author, and strategist on international affairs. He is the founder and chairman of Geopolitical Futures, an online publication that analyzes and forecasts the course of global events. Prior to founding Geopolitical Futures, he was chairman of its predecessor Stratfor, the private intelligence publishing and consulting firm he founded in 1996.

Early life and education
Friedman was born in Budapest, Hungary in 1949 to Jewish parents who survived the Holocaust. His family fled Hungary when he was a child to escape the Communist regime as refugees, settling first in a camp for displaced persons in Austria and then emigrating to the United States. Friedman describes his family's story as "a very classic story of refugees making a new life in America." He grew up in New York City. Friedman received a B.A. at the City College of New York, where he majored in political science, and a Ph.D. in government at Cornell University.

Career
After the collapse of the Soviet Union, he studied potential for a Japan-U.S. conflict and co-authored with his wife The Coming War with Japan in 1991.

In 1996, Friedman founded Stratfor, a private intelligence and forecasting company, and served as the company's CEO and Chief Intelligence Officer. Stratfor's head office is in Austin, Texas. He resigned from Stratfor in May 2015. That year, he founded Geopolitical Futures.

Friedman's reputation as a forecaster of geopolitical events led The New York Times magazine to comment, in a profile, "There is a temptation, when you are around George Friedman, to treat him like a Magic 8-Ball”. 

In The Next Decade, Friedman argues how the U.S. administrations of the 2010s will need to create regional power balances, some of which have been disturbed. Friedman conceptualizes successful U.S. management of world affairs not by directly enforcing countries, but by creating competing relationships, which offset one another, in the world's different regions. For example, in the past, Iraq balanced Iran, and currently Japan balances China. Friedman asserts this is the decade where the U.S. as a power must mature to manage its power and balance as an unintended empire and republic.

Friedman's latest book was released in 2020 by Doubleday. While originally scheduled to be released in January 2018, it was delayed six times before being released in 2020. The working title was The New American Century: Crisis, Endurance, and the Future of the United States, but has subsequently been changed to The Storm Before the Calm: America's Discord, the Coming Crisis of the 2020s, and the Triumph Beyond.

Personal life
Friedman is married to Meredith Friedman (née LeBard), has four children, and lives in Austin, Texas. He and his wife have co-authored several publications, including The Coming War with Japan.

Bibliography

The Political Philosophy of the Frankfurt School (1981). Cornell University Press, .
The Coming War With Japan, with Meredith LeBard (1991). St Martins Press. Reprint edition, 1992, .
The Future of War: Power, Technology and American World Dominance in the Twenty-First Century, with Meredith Friedman (1996). Crown Publishers, 1st edition, . St. Martin's Griffin, 1998, .
The Intelligence Edge: How to Profit in the Information Age with Meredith Friedman, Colin Chapman and John Baker (1997). Crown, 1st edition,  .
America's Secret War: Inside the Hidden Worldwide Struggle Between the United States and Its Enemies (2004).  Doubleday, 1st edition, . Broadway, reprint edition (2005). .
The Next 100 Years: A Forecast for the 21st Century (2009). Doubleday, .
The Next Decade: What the World Will Look Like (2011). .
Flashpoints: The Emerging Crisis in Europe (2015). Doubleday, .
The Storm Before the Calm: America's Discord, the Coming Crisis of the 2020s, and the Triumph Beyond (2020). Doubleday,

References

External links

George Friedman at Geopolitical Futures
New York Times Magazine profile of George Friedman

1949 births
American chief executives
American foreign policy writers
American male non-fiction writers
American people of Hungarian-Jewish descent
American political scientists
American political writers
Businesspeople from New York City
City College of New York alumni
Cornell University alumni
Futurologists
Geopoliticians
Hungarian Jews
Jewish American writers
Living people
New York (state) Republicans
Scholars of Marxism
Writers from Austin, Texas
Writers from Budapest
Writers from New York City